Farewell, Unwashed Russia is a poem by Mikhail Lermontov, written in connection with his last exile from Russian capital cities.

Text 
Third publication and its literal translation:

The poem is written in the genre of political invective and aimed at people in "blue uniforms" and "people, devoted to them". "Blue uniforms" is metonymy used to refer to the Russian Special Corps of Gendarmes.

The text in the third publication is probably the most original version of the poem. The text in the first and second publications is identical, but is different in comparison with the third publication. Instead of "" it says "" and instead of "" it says ". There are also variants with "" or "" instead of "devoted" and "" instead of "pashas". The poem criticizes the lack of freedom in Russia and calls the tsarist servants pashas, pointing to the Turkish, despotic nature of life in Russia.

History 
The poem was written in April 1841, when Lermontov was exiled to the Caucasus from St. Petersburg. However, it was first mentioned only on March 9, 1873 in a letter from Pyotr Bartenev to Pyotr Efremov and first published in 1887 in the journal Russkaya Starina by Pavel Viskatov.

In the 20th century, the poem received a rise in popularity. A number of literary critics have expressed doubts about the authorship of the poem.  In 2017, an international round table dedicated to the issue of authorship was assembled, which included more than twenty leading Lermontovedians. As a result of the round table, a resolution was adopted that confirmed the authorship.

Reception and use 
The poem is included in the Russian school curriculum.

In 1890, Vladimir Korolenko, speaking about the poem, wrote: "Bright and strong. Lermontov knew how to feel like a free man, he knew how to portray these feelings. In our time, this is already an anachronism, this does not happen anymore! ... Now, even behind the wall of the Caucasus, you can't hide from the all-seeing eyes!" Larissa Volpert said that the poem is "the pinnacle of Lermontov's political lyrics".

Russian politician and historian :
References to the poem were made by various Russian composers. The line "Farewell, unwashed Russia" is used in Nikolay Kolyada's play "Oginsky's Polonaise". Zelimkhan Yandarbiyev in his 1995 article writes: "You were unwashed, and remain unwashed" referring to the first verse of the poem.

In 2017, the poem was quoted by the then President of Ukraine, Petro Poroshenko.

References 

Poetry by Mikhail Lermontov
1841 poems
1887 poems